The Oran Metro (Arab : مترو وهران) is planned to be an extensive network of rapid transit electrified railway lines that will run mostly underground in central Oran and into the city's suburbs. It will be part of the larger public transport system of Oran, the second largest city in Algeria.

History
The Oran metro project was launched in 2008, with its construction then planned to start in 2014. The route would then serve the SNTF railway station and the headquarters of the Wilaya of Oran. The Metro will then continue north east of the city along Hai Mactaa Gambetta and finally along the Millennium Boulevard and arrive at Bir El Djir.

In January 2014, despite the technical study not being completed, it was announced that a tender involving international bidders would be launched for the first section, after the finalisation of the technical study.

In March 2014, the director of transportation of the Oran Wilaya, with representatives of the project owner Enterprise Metro d'Alger (EMA) advised that the technical study had been finalized. The start of construction was scheduled for the end of 2014 for the first stage.

External links
 Oran Metro
  Sener infrastructures Transport - Oran Metro
 Subways.net Oran Metro

 
Metro
Underground rapid transit in Algeria
Electric railways in Algeria
Rail transport in Algeria
Proposed public transport